Edmund Michael Dunne (February 2, 1864 – October 17, 1929) was an American prelate of the Roman Catholic Church. He served as bishop of the Diocese of Peoria in Illinois from 1909 until his death in 1929.

Biography

Early life 
Edmund Dunne was born on February 2, 1864, in Chicago, Illinois, to an Irish family, and attended the parochial school of Holy Name Cathedral in Chicago He studied at St. Ignatius College in Chicago before entering Niagara University in Lewiston, New York. He completed his theological studies at the American College of the Immaculate Conception in Leuven, Belgium. Dunne could converse in Italian, Polish, Greek and French.

Priesthood 
Dunne was ordained to the priesthood for the Archdiocese of Chicago by Archbishop Patrick Feehan on June 24, 1887. Dunne furthered his studies at the Pontifical Gregorian University in Rome, obtaining a Doctor of Divinity degree in 1890. After returning to Chicago, he received his first pastoral assignment at St. Columbkille Parish in Chicago, where he remained for eight years. He was later named pastor of Guardian Angels Parish and chancellor of the archdiocese.

Bishop of Peoria 
On June 30, 1909, Dunne was appointed as the second bishop of the Diocese of Peoria by Pope Pius X. He received his episcopal consecration on September 1, 1909, from Archbishop Diomede Falconio, with Bishops John Janssen and Peter Muldoon serving as co-consecrators.

During the early 1920s, the future Archbishop Fulton Sheen, a popular television host in the 1950s, was a priest in the diocese.  After spending time in pastoral and teaching jobs in the United Kingdom, Dunne told Sheen to return to Peoria in 1925.  Both Columbia University in New York and Oxford University in England offered him teaching positions.  However, instead of allowing Sheen to take one of these prestigious position, Dunne assigned him as a curate to St. Patrick's, a poor parish in Peoria.  Sheen took the assignment without any complaints and enjoyed his time there.  Nine months later, Dunne summoned Sheen to his office.  Dunne told him:I promised you to Catholic University over a year ago.  They told me that with all your traipsing around Europe, you'd be so high hat you couldn't take orders.  But Father Cullen says you've been a good boy at St. Patrick's.  So run along to Washington.Edmund Dunn died on October 17, 1929, at age 65.

Works
 Polemic Chat (1912)
 Memoirs of Zi Pre' (1914)

References

 

1864 births
1929 deaths
Clergy from Chicago
20th-century Roman Catholic bishops in the United States
Catholic University of Leuven (1834–1968) alumni
American College of the Immaculate Conception alumni
Niagara University alumni
Loyola University Chicago alumni
Roman Catholic bishops of Peoria